Euthyone parima is a moth of the subfamily Arctiinae first described by Schaus in 1896. It is found in the Brazilian state of São Paulo.

References

External links
Original description: Journal of the New York Entomological Society

Lithosiini
Moths described in 1896